Valparaíso Province is one of eight provinces of the central Chilean region of Valparaíso (V). Its capital is the coastal city of Valparaíso (pop. 275,982).

Administration
As a province, Valparaíso is a second-level administrative division, it was governed by a provincial governor who was appointed by the president. Since 2021, however, it is directly governmed by a regional presidential delegate, also appointed by the President, because one of its communes is the regional capital.

Communes
The province comprises seven communes (Spanish: comunas), each governed by a municipality consisting of an alcalde and municipal council:

Valparaíso
Viña del Mar
Concón
Quintero
Puchuncaví
Casablanca
Juan Fernández

History
A province with the same name was first created on October 27, 1842, being originally composed of the Valparaíso, Casablanca and Quillota Departments. This law segregated the department of Quillota from the province of Aconcagua, as well as the departments of Valparaíso and Casablanca from that of Santiago. Its capital was the city of the same name. In 1857 the deparmtnets of Ferrocarril and Juan Fernández were created, with both being ultimately disestablished in 1925, the same year the department of Limache was created. In 1966 the Isla de Pascua Department was established, which incorporated the province, before finally being succeeded by the Valparaíso Region in 1976.

On March 11, 2010, the communes of Quilpué and Villa Alemana were transferred to Marga Marga Province under Law 20,368 (signed August 25, 2009).

Geography and demography
According to the 2002 census, Valparaíso was the most populous province in the region with a population of 651,821. At that time, there were 639,255 people living in urban areas, 12,566 people living in rural areas, 315,785 men and 336,036 women.

References

External links

 Official link

Provinces of Chile
Provinces of Valparaíso Region